The 'Dead End' Kids "On Dress Parade" is a 1939 Warner Bros. film that marked the first time The Dead End Kids headlined a film without any other well-known actors.

Plot
A hero of World War I, Colonel William Duncan, is on his deathbed.  He summons his old friend, Colonel Mitchell Reiker to ask him if he will care for his son Slip when he dies.  Reiker agrees, and when Duncan passes, Slip, who does not want to leave the neighborhood he grew up in, is tricked into attending the military school that Reiker is in charge of.

Cadet Major Rollins tries to help Slip reform and adapt to military life, but is thrown out a window for his troubles.  He continues to have altercations with all of the other cadets, but in the end he winds up saving the life of Cadet Warren during a fire in the camp munitions storeroom.  Although he is seriously injured during the rescue, the other cadets respect his efforts and welcome him as one of their own.  For his heroics he is given his father's distinguished service cross and given the title of cadet major.

Cast

The Dead End Kids
Billy Halop as Cadet Major Rollins
Bobby Jordan as Cadet Ronny Morgan
Leo Gorcey as Slip Duncan
Gabriel Dell as Cadet Georgie Warren
Huntz Hall as Cadet Johnny Cabot
Bernard Punsly as Dutch

Additional cast

Frankie Thomas as Cadet Lieutenant Murphy
John Litel as Col. Michael Riker
Cissie Loftus as Mrs. Neely
Selmer Jackson as Capt. Evans Dover
Aldrich Bowker as Father Ryan
Douglas Meins as Hathaway
William Gould as Dr. Lewis
Don Douglas as Col. Wm. Duncan
Emory Parnell as Policeman - Paddy

Character portrayals
This is the only Dead End Kids film in which Gorcey appears in the type of role he would assume throughout the East Side Kids and The Bowery Boys films, as the tough guy malcontent/gang leader.  His character's name, Slip, also became his official character name in the Bowery Boys films.  In addition, this is Bernard Punsly's briefest appearance in any of their films.

Production
Alternate titles for this film are Dead End Kids on Dress Parade and Dead End Kids at Military School.

Reception
Variety wrote, "They're cleaned up, brushed up, put in military school uniforms, turned into refined little gentlemen--and it's too bad. It's too bad <...> that if the transition had to be made it should be in such a mawkishly sentimental and obvious picture. It just doesn't ring true."

Home media
The film was released as a double feature DVD by Warner Archives with Hell's Kitchen on January 22, 2013.

References

External links 

1939 films
American black-and-white films
Warner Bros. films
Films directed by Noel M. Smith 
Films directed by William Clemens
Films set in boarding schools
American drama films
1939 drama films
1930s English-language films
1930s American films